A Detergent is a surfactant with cleaning properties in dilute solutions.

Detergent may also refer to:

 Biological detergent, a laundry detergent that contains enzymes
 Laundry detergent, a cleaning agent for laundry
 The Detergents, a 1960s musical group